Florence Sally Horner (April 18, 1937  August 18, 1952) was an American girl who, at the age of 11, was abducted serial child molester Frank La Salle in June, 1948 and held captive for 21 months before being rescued in March, 1950. It is believed that Vladimir Nabokov drew on the details of her case in writing his novel Lolita, although Nabokov has consistently denied this.

Background 
Florence Sally Horner was born on April 18, 1937 in Camden, New Jersey. She was raised solely by her mother, Ella Horner, after her father died by suicide in 1941. At the time of her kidnapping, Horner was a student at Northeast Elementary School, where she was noted as an honors student.

Abduction 
In March, 1948, 10-year-old Horner attempted to steal a five-cent notebook from a Woolworths in Camden, New Jersey. Frank La Salle, a 50-year-old mechanic who had recently served a prison sentence for molesting girls, caught her stealing. He told her that he was an FBI agent, and threatened to have her sent to a reform school unless she reported to him periodically.

In June 1948, he abducted Horner. La Salle instructed her to tell her mother he was the father of two of her school friends and she had been invited on their family vacation to the Jersey Shore. He spent 21 months traveling with her in different U.S. states. According to charges later brought against La Salle, it was during this period that he raped her repeatedly. While attending school in Dallas, Texas, Horner confided her secret to a friend. Later she escaped from La Salle, and phoned her sister at home, asking her to send the FBI. When arrested on March 22, 1950, in San Jose, California, La Salle claimed that he was Horner's father. However, authorities in New Jersey confirmed that Horner's real father had died seven years previously. La Salle was tried, convicted, and sentenced to 30 to 35 years in prison under the Mann Act.

Death
Horner died in a car accident near Woodbine, New Jersey, on August 18, 1952. As the Associated Press reported on August 20, 1952: "Florence Sally Horner, a 15-year-old Camden, N.J., girl who spent 21 months as the captive of a middle-aged morals offender a few years ago, was killed in a highway accident when the car in which she was riding plowed into the rear of a parked truck."

Cultural references
Critic Alexander Dolinin proposed in 2005 that Frank La Salle and Florence Sally Horner were the real life prototypes of Humbert Humbert and Dolores "Lolita" Haze from Lolita by Vladimir Nabokov. 

Sarah Weinman's 2018 book The Real Lolita deals with the Horner case and also alleges that Horner's ordeal inspired Lolita. 

Although Nabokov had already used the same basic idea—that of a child molester and his victim booking into a hotel as father and daughter—in his then unpublished 1939 work Volshebnik  (Волшебник), it is still possible that he drew on the details of the Horner case in writing Lolita. An English translation of Volshebnik was published in 1985 as The Enchanter. Nabokov explicitly mentions the Horner case in Chapter 33, Part II of Lolita: "Had I done to Dolly, perhaps, what Frank Lasalle, a fifty-year-old mechanic, had done to eleven-year-old Sally Horner in 1948?"

See also
List of kidnappings

Further reading

References

1937 births
1940s missing person cases
1952 deaths
Child sexual abuse in the United States
Formerly missing people
Incidents of violence against girls
Kidnapped American children
Missing person cases in New Jersey
Rapes in the United States
Road incident deaths in New Jersey
People from New Jersey